Yavuz Şimşek (born 1947 in Samsun) was a Turkish football player of Fenerbahçe between 1967–77  He played as a goalkeeper.

He started his professional career in Ankara with PTT Ankara (1965–67). Then he transferred to Fenerbahçe where he played ten years between 1967–77 and scored played 251 matches with them. He won 1967-68, 1969–70, 1973–74 and 1974-75 Turkish League.

References

1947 births
Turkish footballers
Turkey international footballers
Fenerbahçe S.K. footballers
Living people
Association football goalkeepers